DC Trident is a professional swimming team based in Washington, D.C. DC Trident competes in the International Swimming League (ISL), which is a global, professional swimming league consisting of ten teams: the DC Trident, the New York Breakers, the L.A. Current, the Cali Condors, the Aqua Centurions, Energy Standard, the London Roar, Team IRON, the Toronto Titans, and the Tokyo Frog Kings.

Team history and formation
The team was founded in 2019 as part of the ISL's inaugural season. League founder and President Konstantin Grigorishin selected multi-Olympic medalist Kaitlin Sandeno as the club's general manager.

2019 ISL season 
DC Trident competed in three meets around the world throughout the three-month-long season. The team finished in an overall standing of sixth, scoring 975 total points, and winning a total of 14 races. The men and women contributed nearly the same number of points to the team total, with the women earning 476 points and the men earning 463. The league was split into two brackets, consisting of four teams each – two American and two European clubs. DC Trident competed in a bracket with the Cali Condors, Energy Standard, and the Aqua Centurions.

DC Trident's first meet took place October 5–6 in Indianapolis, Indiana in the United States, where the team took third place. Its next competition took place the next week, October 12–13 in Naples, Italy, where DC Trident once again took third place, this time by a mere half of a point.

The team's third and final meet took place November 16–17, just outside the team's home of Washington, D.C. in College Park, M.D. Labeled by the league as "The American Derby," the meet featured all four ISL teams based in the United States. Following the pattern of the first two meets, DC Trident edged out the New York Breakers to earn third place.

2019 roster

Match results

The Legend of the Trident
In commemoration of their first season, DC trident announced The Legend of the Trident comic and souvenir program. Created in conjunction with multi award-winning editor Rantz Hoseley, the comic book consists of photos and information on the team and its members, along with an exclusive comic book story written by New York Times bestselling writer Tony Lee.

2020 ISL season
DC Trident competed in the second season of the ISL with an updated 2020 roster.

DC Trident competed in meets two, four, five, and seven in Budapest. During their first meet, they placed third with a total of 350 points. In their second meet, they placed fourth with 287 points. In their third meet, they placed fourth with 287 points. In their fourth and final meet of the season, they placed fourth with 256 points. Their total of 1181 points placed them ninth among the ten teams.

2020 roster

Match results

2021 ISL season 
DC Trident will compete in the third season of the ISL.

References 

Swimming clubs
International Swimming League
Sports teams in Washington, D.C.
Swim teams in the United States